Newport station may refer to:

Australia
Newport railway station, Melbourne, a railway station in Melbourne, Australia

Canada
Newport Station, Nova Scotia, a community in the Municipal District of West Hants

United Kingdom
England
Newport railway station (Essex), a railway station in Newport, Essex
Newport railway station (Shropshire), a disused railway station in Newport, Shropshire
Newport Pagnell railway station, a former railway station in Newport Pagnell, Buckinghamshire
Wallingfen railway station, a former railway station in the East Riding of Yorkshire, originally known as Newport

Isle of Wight
Newport bus station (Isle of Wight), the central bus terminus in Newport
Newport railway station (Isle of Wight Central Railway), the demolished Newport hub of the Isle of Wight Central Railway's network
Newport railway station (Freshwater, Yarmouth and Newport Railway), the demolished Newport terminus of the Freshwater, Yarmouth and Newport Railway
Newport Pan Lane railway station, the temporary terminus of the Isle of Wight (Newport Junction) Railway

Scotland
East Newport railway station, on the closed Newport Railway in Newport-on-Tay, Fife
West Newport railway station, another station in Newport-on-Tay, also on the Newport Railway

Wales
Newport bus station, the central bus terminus in the city of Newport
Newport railway station, a railway station in the city of Newport
Newport Courtybella railway station, a temporary station in the city of Newport
Newport West railway station, a proposed station in the city of Newport

United States
Newport station (Hudson–Bergen Light Rail), in Jersey City, New Jersey
Newport station (PATH), in Jersey City, New Jersey
Newport Railroad Station, in Newport, Delaware